Siphona maculata is a Palearctic species of fly in the family Tachinidae.

Distribution
Most of Europe, Russia.

Hosts
Noctuidae.

References

Tachininae
Diptera of Europe
Insects described in 1849